Marco Zullo (born 29 October 1978 in Verona) is an Italian politician who has been serving as a Member of the European Parliament since 2014. He was re-elected in 2019. From 2014 to 2021, he was part of the Five Star Movement.

Education and early career
Zullo holds a bachelor’s degree in computer science and electronic engineering from University of Padua. From 2012 to 2014, he worked as product manager for Hager Group in Porcia.

Political career
In parliament, Zullo has been serving on the Committee on the Internal Market and Consumer Protection (since 2015) and the Committee on Women’s Rights and Gender Equality (since 2019). From 2014 to 2019, he was also a member of the Committee on Agriculture and Rural Development.

In addition to his committee assignments, Zullo is part of the parliament’s delegation to the EU-Albania Stabilisation and Association Parliamentary Committee. He co-chairs the European Parliament Intergroup on Demographic Challenges, Family-Work Balance and Youth Transitions and is also a member of the European Parliament Intergroup on the Welfare and Conservation of Animals and the Parliament’s Cultural Creators Friendship Group (CCFG).

In 2021, Zullo joined the Renew Europe group in the European Parliament.

References

Living people
MEPs for Italy 2014–2019
MEPs for Italy 2019–2024
Five Star Movement MEPs
Five Star Movement politicians
Politicians from Verona
1978 births